Tiësto in Concert 2 is a DVD of Tiësto's performance on October 29/30, 2004 in Arnhem's GelreDome.

The theme of the 2004 show is "Magik", a word which has become somewhat a trademark for the 3-time-in-a-row winner of DJ Mags Top 100 list. All sorts of "Magik" were incorporated into the shows, complementing Tiësto's sounds with visual entertainment. Also several guest performers showcased their talents by performing with and alongside Tiësto during the night, such as Matt Hales from Aqualung and violin player DJ Mason, Micha Klein, the Bulgarian Children of Orpheus choir and loads of fireworks.

Video listing

References

 http://www.discogs.com/release/356836 https://www.discogs.com/Ti%C3%ABsto-Ti%C3%ABsto-In-Concert-2/release/4189368

External links
 Tiësto in Concert 2 on YouTube
 

Tiësto video albums
2004 video albums
Live video albums
2004 live albums